The 2015–16 season was Manchester United's 24th season in the Premier League, and their 41st consecutive season in the top flight of English football. Along with the Premier League, the club also competed in the FA Cup, Football League Cup, UEFA Champions League and UEFA Europa League. The season saw Manchester United win a then record-equalling 12th FA Cup with a 2–1 victory over Crystal Palace in the 2016 FA Cup Final.

Pre-season and friendlies

Manchester United announced a shortened pre-season tour of the United States on 28 April 2015. The first match against Mexican side Club América was played on 17 July at CenturyLink Field in Seattle, and was followed, four days later, by a game against Major League Soccer's San Jose Earthquakes at the Earthquakes' home ground, Avaya Stadium in San Jose. It was originally scheduled to be played at California Memorial Stadium in Berkeley, but it was moved to reduce the amount of travelling the team would have to do. Four days later, Manchester United faced European champions Barcelona at Levi's Stadium in Santa Clara, California, before completing the campaign at Chicago's Soldier Field with a game against Paris Saint-Germain.

Premier League

August
The fixtures for this league season were announced on 17 June 2015 at 09:00 BST. Manchester United began their campaign with a 1–0 win at home to Tottenham Hotspur on 8 August, with an own goal from Kyle Walker proving the difference between the two teams.

United then went top of the League for the first time since August 2013 with another 1–0 win over Aston Villa at Villa Park the following Friday; Adnan Januzaj's goal in the 29th minute was his first since April 2014. The game had moved to Friday for policing reasons due to an English Defence League march in nearby Walsall the following day, a decision which also gave United an extra day to prepare for their UEFA Champions League play-off against Club Brugge. United kept a third clean sheet in a row at home to Newcastle United on 22 August, but the forwards were unable to find the net and the match finished as a goalless draw.

In the final fixture before the first international break, United conceded their first goals of the season as they lost 2–1 to Swansea City at the Liberty Stadium. After going ahead early in the second half through Juan Mata, they conceded twice in five minutes just after the hour mark, first to a header from André Ayew, who then provided the assist for Bafétimbi Gomis.

September
Following the international break, Manchester United returned to action with a home match against Liverpool. The first half was goalless, but goals from Daley Blind and Ander Herrera gave them the lead going into the last ten minutes. Christian Benteke then pulled one back for Liverpool with a bicycle kick before deadline day signing Anthony Martial scored a debut goal to seal a 3–1 win. Martial continued his scoring when United won 3–2 away to Southampton. Graziano Pellè first gave Southampton the lead before Martial scored a brace; the first goal before halftime and the second goal after. United also added a third goal from Juan Mata before Pellè could score his second and the final goal of the match.

On 26 September, United went on top of the league for the first time in over two years after beating Sunderland at home. Memphis Depay opened the scoring in first half stoppage time and Wayne Rooney scored 40 seconds into the second half – ending his longest barren spell in the Premier League after not scoring in 11 matches – before Juan Mata scored the final goal in the last minute of regular time to secure a 3–0 win.

October
In their next match, 4 October, the last match before a new international break, United suffered a 3–0 defeat against Arsenal at Emirates Stadium, which was their worst defeat against the Gunners in the league for 17 years. Arsenal drew first blood through an Alexis Sánchez goal in the sixth minute before Mesut Özil added to the score barely 74 seconds later. Sánchez completed his brace in the 19th minute to condemn United to their second loss in the League this season, which made United drop to third in the league standings, behind Arsenal on goal difference.

After the international break, United travelled to Goodison Park to play Everton. After having lost 3–0 at the stadium the previous season, they won by the same scoreline after two early goals from Morgan Schneiderlin, Ander Herrera and a goal in the 62nd minute from United captain and former Everton player Wayne Rooney.

Their next match was the Manchester derby against Manchester City at Old Trafford. The match ended goalless, for the first time since 2010. Their next game, against Crystal Palace ended goalless as well, meaning United were down to fourth place at the end of the month.

November
United's first match of November saw them beat West Bromwich Albion 2–0 at Old Trafford. Jesse Lingard scored his first goal for the club seven minutes into the second half. In the first minute of stoppage time, West Brom went down to ten men after Gareth McAuley was sent off following a foul on Anthony Martial, which gave United a penalty, which Juan Mata took to seal the win for United.

After another international break, United faced Watford at Vicarage Road for the first time since 2006. Memphis Depay opened the scoring in the 11th minute after he volleyed a cross from Ander Herrera. Watford equalised late on through a Troy Deeney penalty, but then he put it into his own goal in stoppage time to give United back–to–back victories. On the following Saturday, they travelled to the King Power Stadium to play Leicester City. Jamie Vardy opened the scoring in the 24th minute, scoring in his 11th consecutive game. Bastian Schweinsteiger levelled the match before half–time, and no goals were scored in the second half, meaning both sides shared the points.

December
The club's first match of December was a goalless draw against West Ham United at Old Trafford. On 12 December, United travelled to Dean Court to face AFC Bournemouth, who were new to the Premier League. They fell behind after two minutes when Junior Stanislas struck the first goal from a corner. Marouane Fellaini levelled 22 minutes later, but Bournemouth hit back after Joshua King headed home the winner in the 54th minute.

They then suffered a second loss in a row, this time at home to another newly promoted side, this time it was Norwich City. Cameron Jerome headed in the opener seven minutes before half–time, then Alexander Tettey put the visitors 2–0 up in the 54th minute. Martial pulled one back but it was not enough, and it meant United were out of the top four (and, like in the 2013–14 season, when David Moyes was manager, they stayed out for the remainder of the season).

On Boxing Day, United travelled to the Britannia Stadium to face Stoke City. Yet again, it was another defeat, this time it was 2–0, meaning that United lost three matches in a row like what happened in May the previous season. Their final game of 2015 was a goalless draw at home to struggling and defending champions Chelsea. This meant United ended 2015 in sixth position after a run of six league games without a win, their worst run of results since January 1990.

January
United started 2016 with a home game against Swansea, and gained revenge on the Swans for their three–straight defeats by winning 2–1. It was United's first win since the away match against Watford in November. Anthony Martial headed in the opener two minutes into the second half. Gylfi Sigurðsson levelled in the 70th minute, but seven minutes later, Wayne Rooney flicked home the winner. Their next match saw them travel to St James' Park to play Newcastle. Rooney scored a penalty in the ninth minute before Jesse Lingard added his name to the scoresheet 29 minutes later. Georgino Wijnaldum pulled one back for Newcastle before half–time, then in the second half, Newcastle scored a penalty courtesy of Aleksandar Mitrović in the 67th minute. Twelve minutes later, Rooney pulled one back for United, but Paul Dummett equalised in the 90th minute, ending the match 3–3.

United returned to winning ways in their next match, defeating arch-rivals Liverpool 1–0, courtesy of a late Wayne Rooney strike. However United struggled initially to build on this victory, losing their next match at home to Southampton, with Charlie Austin scoring a late winner. United were subsequently booed off at full time by their fans. This result left United five points off of the top four at the end of the month.

February
United kick-started February in scintillating form, defeating Stoke City 3–0 at Old Trafford. Jesse Lingard, Antony Martial and Wayne Rooney supplied the goals. In the next game, United secured a strong point against Chelsea, drawing 1–1. Jesse Lingard opened the scoring on the hour mark, before a defensive lapse allowed Diego Costa to rescue a point for Chelsea in the closing stages of the match. One week later, United suffered a surprise defeat to relegation-contenders Sunderland, going down 2–1. Anthony Martial cancelled out an early Wahbi Khazri opener, before a De Gea own goal provided Sunderland with the three points.

An injury-hit United however rallied in their next match, gaining a surprise (given the circumstances) victory over Arsenal at Old Trafford, winning 3–2. This game was noticeable for the emergence of Marcus Rashford, who scored a brace on his Premier League debut. Danny Welbeck and Mesut Özil both scored for Arsenal, yet Rashford's brace and a deflected Ander Herrera effort secured the win for United.

March
United won their opening fixture in March, defeating a stubborn Watford side 1–0, with Juan Mata securing the three points with an 83rd minute free-kick. However, in the next fixture, United lost 1–0 to West Bromwich Albion. Juan Mata was sent off in the first half, with United struggling with the man disadvantage. This was West Bromwich Albion's first home victory over United in 32 years.

United's next match was away to rivals Manchester City. Both sides were embroiled in a battle for a place in the Champions League. United won the derby, with Marcus Rashford continuing his meteoric rise by scoring the winner. Rashford became the youngest scorer in the history of the Manchester derby after his goal. The win kept the top-four hopes of United alive. Manager Louis Van Gaal also attracted praise for placing his faith in his young squad. This faith reaped dividends as United marched on.

April
United maintained momentum by beating Everton 1–0 at the start of April. Anthony Martial continued his fine season by scoring a second-half winner. This win left United just one point behind fourth-placed Manchester City. Yet United were unable to capitalise on their recent gains, losing 3–0 to Tottenham in the next game. This meant United fell further behind City.

Yet United returned to winning ways in their next match – defeating Aston Villa 1–0. Once again, Marcus Rashford scored the winner. United rounded off April with a 2–0 win over Crystal Palace. A Damien Delaney own goal was followed up by a Matteo Darmian effort to keep United in the top-four race.

May
United began the final month of the season with a 1–1 home draw against eventual champions Leicester. Anthony Martial gave United an early lead, yet Wes Morgan equalised. Despite dominating possession, United were unable to force a winner. United kept their Champions League hopes alive with a 1–0 away victory over Norwich City. Juan Mata scored the winner.

After Manchester City slipped up, United knew two wins from their final two games would secure a top-four finish. However United failed to capitalise on this opportunity, losing 3–2 at West Ham, a club that also had an outside chance of claiming a top-four finish. This was the final game at the Boleyn Ground. United led the match 2–1 courtesy of an Anthony Martial double, yet West Ham produced a late fightback, which appeared to doom any chance of a top-four finish for United.

United required Manchester City to lose to Swansea to stand any reasonable chance of a top-four finish. United had a home fixture with Bournemouth to end the campaign. However, while both games were due to kick-off at the same time on 15 May, a 'suspect package' was found at Old Trafford, leading to a full stadium evacuation. The match was eventually postponed amid safety fears. The incident was subsequently revealed to be a hoax, being labelled a 'fiasco'. This bizarre set of circumstances deprived United of a chance to apply pressure on City. City drew at Swansea, all but securing Champions League football. United's match against Bournemouth was re-arranged for midweek. United brought the curtain down on the campaign in style, winning 3–1. Wayne Rooney, Marcus Rashford and Ashley Young scored the goals. After 38 games, United secured a haul of 66 points, good for fifth position. This finish secured Europa League football for the 2016–17 season.

Matches

League table

FA Cup

United entered the FA Cup in the third round together with the other Premier League clubs, as well as those from the Championship. The draw was made on 7 December 2015, which saw United drawn at home to Sheffield United from League One. United got their first shot on target through substitute Memphis Depay, who was fouled in second half stoppage time by Dean Hammond for a penalty kick, from which Wayne Rooney scored the only goal with United's only other shot on target. Manager Louis van Gaal was under pressure for Manchester United's poor form prior to the match, and the victory was compared to one in the same competition in 1990, in which a goal by Mark Robins reportedly saved the career of Alex Ferguson.

Twenty days later in the next round, United travelled to Pride Park to play Derby County, situated in the play-off places in the Championship. Rooney scored the first goal from outside the penalty area, but George Thorne soon equalised. In the second half, further United goals by Daley Blind and Juan Mata relieved Van Gaal of further pressure; it was the first time in 15 games that the team won by a margin of more than one goal.

On 22 February, United played the fifth round away at League One strugglers Shrewsbury Town. Chris Smalling opened the scoring, and Mata doubled the advantage in first-half added time. Jesse Lingard confirmed a 3–0 win with about half an hour left to play; in the closing stages United had to play with only 10 men when Will Keane was injured and no substitutes remained.

United hosted their sixth-round match against top-flight opponents West Ham United on 13 March. The visitors took the lead via a free-kick from Dimitri Payet, and only seven minutes remained when the hosts equalised with Anthony Martial's close-range finish. A month later, the game went to a replay, the final FA Cup match at the Boleyn Ground. A curled effort from Marcus Rashford gave Manchester United a lead in the second half, and the lead was doubled by Marouane Fellaini. West Ham halved the deficit late on after James Tomkins' header passed into David de Gea's net, and they threatened an equaliser but could not achieve it.

On 23 April, Manchester United travelled to Wembley to play Everton in the semi-finals. Martial assisted Fellaini to open the scoring against his former team, giving a half-time lead. After the break, a penalty was given when Timothy Fosu-Mensah fouled Ross Barkley, but De Gea saved the spot-kick after Romelu Lukaku took it. Everton brought on Gerard Deulofeu whose cross was put into United's net via a Chris Smalling own goal to level the scores. In added time, Ander Herrera set up Martial for the winner.

United's opponents for the final were Crystal Palace, in a repeat of the 1990 showpiece which United won after a replay. Palace took the lead in the 78th minute through Jason Puncheon but Juan Mata equalised three minutes later, taking the match into extra time. Chris Smalling became the fourth player in FA Cup final history to be sent off, for a second bookable offence just before the end of the first period of extra time. With 10 minutes to go, Jesse Lingard scored the winner for United with a right-foot volley, clinching the club's record-equalling 12th FA Cup.

League Cup

As one of eight English clubs who qualified for European competition in the 2014–15 season, United received a bye to the third round of the League Cup. The draw for the third round took place on 25 August and paired United with Championship side Ipswich Town. United won the game against Ipswich 3–0, with goals from Rooney, a direct free kick by academy product Andreas Pereira, and the final goal from in-form substitute Martial. The draw for the fourth round was held on 23 September 2015. United were drawn at home to Middlesbrough from the Championship. United lost 3–1 on penalties after a goalless draw after extra time.

UEFA Champions League

Play-off round

Having finished fourth in the league last season, Manchester United began their UEFA Champions League campaign in the play-off round. They were seeded in the 'League Route' for the draw, which took place in Nyon on 7 August 2015. United were drawn in a two-legged tie against Belgian Pro League runners-up Club Brugge, which they won 7–1 on aggregate, ensuring their place in the group stage after a one-season absence.

Group stage

The group stage draw was made on 27 August 2015 in Monaco. Manchester United were drawn into Group B with Dutch champions PSV, the runners-up from Russia and Germany, CSKA Moscow and VfL Wolfsburg. Manchester United had been drawn in the same group as CSKA Moscow and Wolfsburg in 2009–10, while they had met PSV in the first group stage of the 2000–01 competition. United suffered a shock defeat to PSV in the first game as the hosts came from behind to win 2–1, after Depay scored the opener following his brace against Club Brugge in the play-offs. Héctor Moreno levelled the game at half-time, and Luciano Narsingh sealed the game in the 56th minute. In the 24th minute, United's in-form left-back Luke Shaw suffered a broken leg in a challenge with Moreno, keeping him out for six months.

UEFA Europa League

As one of the best four third-placed finishers in the Champions League group stage, United were seeded for the Europa League round of 32 draw, along with the group stage winners. The draw took place on 14 December 2015 and saw United drawn against Danish champions Midtjylland, with the away tie taking place on 18 February and the home tie on 25 February 2016. Despite taking the lead, United overcame a 2–1 deficit from the first leg to win 6–3 on aggregate. The round of 16 draw, which was held on 26 February, pitted United with rivals Liverpool for the first European meeting between the sides. United exited the tournament, losing 3–1 on aggregate.

Squad statistics

Statistics accurate as of 21 May 2016.

Transfers

In

Out

Loan out

Notes

References

Manchester United
Manchester United F.C. seasons
Manchester United
Manchester United